Nkoarisambu is an administrative ward in the Meru District  of the Arusha Region of Tanzania. The ward is the least populous ward in the distric. According to the 2002 census, the ward has a total population of 6,497.

References

Wards of Meru District
Wards of Arusha Region